A liftboat is a self-propelled, self-elevating vessel used in support of various offshore mineral exploration and production or offshore construction activities. A liftboat has a relatively large open deck to accommodate equipment and supplies, and the capability of raising its hull clear of the water on its own legs so as to provide a stable platform from which maintenance and construction work may be conducted.

For liftboats registered to the United States, structures and machinery are covered under Title 46 of the Code of Federal Regulations.  Liftboats are usually outfitted with at least one crane; marine cranes are usually designed to API specification 2C or the equivalent classification society guidelines.

Liftboats are commonly used to perform maintenance on oil and gas well platforms.  The liftboat usually moves on location on a side of the platform where no obstructions or pipelines are observed, lowers its legs and jacks up out of the water.  Because the pads of the liftboat are sitting on a muddy, unstable seafloor, most liftboats practice a safety measure called a preload, where the boat jacks-up the absolute minimum to clear hull from the tips of the significant wave heights, fills its holds with water for weight and allows the boat to settle in the mud for several hours before dumping the water and jacking up to work height.

If the mud of the seafloor gives way under the liftboat, it can fall into the water and put the lives of the crew in danger.  A complete site survey prior to moving on location is an important safety measure to ensure that all seafloor features (including canholes, which are the depressions left by the legs of drilling rigs or liftboats, and also pipelines) are known before choosing a final location.

History
The first liftboat was designed in 1955 by brothers Lynn and Orin Dean in Violet, Louisiana. In the 1950s the Dean brothers owned a repair service for automobiles, marine, and farm equipment called Universal Repair Service, which is now known as EBI, Elevating Boats LLC. , the company operates 30 liftboats that service the shallow water oil and gas industry in the Gulf of Mexico from their liftboat dock in Houma, Louisiana.

Examples

L/B Robert
The legs are 335 feet long (102 m) and it has a main crane and three auxiliary cranes. The vessel uses electro-hydraulic jacking systems, and the cranes are all driven from the segregated machinery spaces.

ORCA series of self-elevating platforms
The ORCA series of self-propelled, self-elevating platforms was designed by Bennett Offshore working in collaboration with the Offshore Technology Development group of Keppel Offshore & Marine. These SEPs range in size from small platforms designed for the Gulf of Mexico to large units up to 115 m in length, capable of installing offshore wind turbines and foundations exceeding 800 tonnes. ORCA platforms can be configured for construction support, light drilling, well intervention, well plug and abandonment, coiled tubing operations, wind farm installation, gas compression and accommodation. The first ORCA 2500, customized for the Middle East and North Africa, was delivered to a Qatari rig operator in February 2016. An ORCA 3500 is currently under construction by Keppel FELS for delivery in Q4 2017.

SUDA 450-L3T
The naval architecture firm A. K. Suda, Ltd. designed a 450-foot (137.25m) truss-legged liftboat for Teras Offshore. When delivered in 2014, it was the world's largest liftboat. The molded steel hull
dimensions are 60m x 54m x 6m, and it is capable of working in water depths up to 367
feet. It has two deck cranes, one leg encircling around the starboard jackcase, and the other a pedestal crane on the port side of the vessel. Its quarters can accommodate 250 people including crew. It was built by Triyards Marine, Saigon Shipyard in Vietnam.

Accidents

Ram XVIII 
Five crew members and 10 offshore workers abandoned ship and were rescued. Three personnel suffered minor injuries, and the accident released an estimated 1000 gallons of hydraulic oil into the Gulf waters. The boat was declared a total loss at an estimated cost of $1.14 million.

The Ram XVIII was a 215-foot liftboat, built in 2015 and owned by Aries Marine Corporation in Lafayette, Louisiana. The National Transportation Safety Board (NTSB) determined that the probable cause of the accident was an industry failure of not providing liftboat operators with enough information about composition of the seafloor. The port leg of the liftboat became unstable, leading to collapse, but it remains unclear whether the sea floor washed away, the leg settled quickly in a "punch-through", or the edge of the nearest canhole collapsed.

Kristin Faye 
The vessel was outfitted with two telescoping boom cranes on its bow. One large-capacity crane was mounted to port and another sat on a pedestal to starboard. The liftboat began listing to port and capsized in about 35 feet of water after workers extended one of the cranes. NTSB report blamed the accident on inadequate preload procedures that failed to account for shifting and loading the crane.

Three crew members were evacuated and one was slightly injured during evacuation. The accident released about 120 gallons of diesel fuel into the Gulf water. The vessel was declared a total loss at a cost of $750,000. Salvage divers reported that the port leg of the liftboat had penetrated about 40 feet (12m) into the sea floor in a punch through.

Seacor Power 

The owner identified the liftboat as Seacor Power, belonging to the firm Seacor Marine, and under hire at the time of the accident by the oil and gas company Talos Energy to transport equipment to their oil platform.

The ship was about  into a voyage from Port Fourchon to an oil platform on the other side of Louisiana's Mississippi River delta. It was operated by Seacor crew members and had 9 service hands on board. The vessel capsized after an unnamed category 1 hurricane raised  winds and rough seas. Six crew members were rescued on the same day from the water. Captain David Ledet, age 63, of Thibodaux, had remained in the wheelhouse calling "mayday" even though the vessel was in trouble; he stayed at his post and continued seeking help for his crew, and was later found deceased. On April 16, the body of a second crew member was recovered  from the capsized boat, leaving 11 people still missing.

Nomenclature
Liftboats go by several names in the marine industry, such as:
Liftboat – used by United States Coast Guard (USCG) & American Bureau of Shipping (ABS)
MOU (Mobile Offshore Unit) – used by Lloyds Register; but also incorporates other types of vessel like Drill Ships and Semi-Submersible drilling rigs that might not necessarily be Self-Propelled
SESV (Self-Elevating Support Vessel) – used by owner/operator GMS
MPSEP (Multi-Purpose Self-Elevating Platform) – used by owner/operator Seafox & shipyard Keppel
SEWOP (Self-Elevating Work-Over Platform) – used by owner/operator Halliburton & oil company Chevron
SEP (Self-Elevating Platform) – used by Naval Architect GustoMSC and Bennett Offshore
Jack-Up Barge – used in the Gulf-of-Mexico prior to USCG regulation as a marine vessel
Jack-Up - used by UK Renewable (ex. BWEA) but are not necessarily self-propelled
Wind-Farm Installation Vessel – used generally in the renewables industry but are not necessarily self-propelled
SEAPUP (Self Elevating And Propulsion Utility Platform) - used by ARCO, BP and Pertamina, at West Java Sea.

References

Boat types